Ute Nestler (born 31 December 1960) is a German former cross-country skier. She competed in the women's 5 kilometres at the 1980 Winter Olympics.

Cross-country skiing results

Olympic Games

References

External links
 

1960 births
Living people
German female cross-country skiers
Olympic cross-country skiers of East Germany
Cross-country skiers at the 1980 Winter Olympics
People from Annaberg-Buchholz
Sportspeople from Saxony